Cyperus cinereobrunneus is a species of sedge that is endemic to Papua New Guinea.

The species was first formally described by the botanist Georg Kükenthal in 1943.

See also
 List of Cyperus species

References

cinereobrunneus
Taxa named by Georg Kükenthal
Flora of New Guinea
Plants described in 1943